Lazaridis may refer to:
 Kostas Lazaridis, Greek resistance fighter
 Prokopios Lazaridis,  Greek Orthodox metropolitan bishop and saint
 Mike Lazaridis, founder of Research in Motion
 Nikolaos Lazaridis, footballer
 Stan Lazaridis, footballer
 Stefanos Lazaridis, stage designer

See also

 14428 Lazaridis
 Lazarides